Brougher is a surname. Notable people with the surname include:

Hilary Brougher, American screenwriter and director
Kerry Brougher, American museum director
William E. Brougher (1889–1965), American WWI and WWII veteran

Surnames of German origin